Robert E. Winslow (September 18, 1916 – January 11, 1994) was an American football player and coach.  He served as the head football coach at the University of Arizona from 1949 to 1951, compiling a record of 12–18–1.

In 1944, Winslow played for the Hollywood Rangers of the short-lived American Football League, an eight-team organization based on the Pacific Coast. Head coach Bill Sargent moved him from end to quarterback, which the United Press partly credited for the team's success. The Rangers finished in first place with a perfect 11–0 record in the league's only season.

His son, Troy Winslow, played as a quarterback at USC in the 1960s.

Head coaching record

References

External links
 

1916 births
1994 deaths
American football ends
American football quarterbacks
Arizona Wildcats football coaches
Brooklyn Dodgers (NFL) players
Detroit Lions coaches
Detroit Lions players
USC Trojans football coaches
USC Trojans football players
People from Garfield County, Colorado
Coaches of American football from California
Players of American football from Inglewood, California